The Devils Brook is a Dorset watercourse of that rises near Higher Ansty (on Pleck Farm, in Pleck or Little Ansty), near to the source of the River Divelish.  It flows past Dewlish (to which it lent its name) and joins the River Piddle at Athelhampton, which in turn flows into Poole Harbour.

Toponymy

See also
List of rivers of England

References

Rivers of Dorset